Citrobacter portucalensis is a bacterium in the genus Citrobacter which has been isolated from a water well sample in Portugal.

References

External links
Type strain of Citrobacter portucalensis at BacDive -  the Bacterial Diversity Metadatabase

Citrobacter
Bacteria described in 2017